Kurt Lohwag (1913–1970) was an Austrian botanist and mycologist. The son of the Austrian mycologist Heinrich Lohwag (1884 - 1945). He was educated at the University of Vienna. For much of his career, he worked at the Hochschule für Bodenkultur, Vienna.

He was honoured in 1970, when botanist Franz Petrak named a genus of fungi, Lohwagiella, which is now a synonym of Niesslia

References

1913 births
1970 deaths
People from Tábor District
20th-century Austrian botanists
Austrian mycologists
University of Vienna alumni
University of Natural Resources and Life Sciences, Vienna